The 2010 Virginia Cavaliers football team represented the University of Virginia in the 2010 NCAA Division I FBS football season as a member of the Coastal Division of the Atlantic Coast Conference (ACC). The Cavaliers, led by first year head coach Mike London, played their home games at Scott Stadium and are members of the Coastal Division of the Atlantic Coast Conference. They finished the season 4–8, 1–7 in ACC play.

Schedule

Personnel

References

Virginia
Virginia Cavaliers football seasons
Virginia Cavaliers football